Smriti Kalra is an Indian actress and model. She first appeared as a lead in 12/24 Karol Bagh as Simmi on Zee TV. She got fame with the title role in Channel V's show Suvreen Guggal – Topper of The Year. She was also seen in show Dil Sambhal Jaa Zara as Ahana on StarPlus. Her debut film Cash released on Disney Hotstar.

Career
She made her acting debut with 12/24 Karol Bagh in which she played the role of Simmi. In 2012 she played the role of Suvreen, a college girl, in the show Suvreen Guggal – Topper of The Year. In 2014, she played the critically acclaimed role of Neha in the show Itti Si Khushi on Sony TV. This show was about a woman of 26 years old with the mind and behaviour of a 16-year-old because of memory loss. In 2015, She hosted the 5th season of the show Pyaar Tune Kya Kiya along with Parth Samthaan on Zing TV. In 2017, she worked in the short film Cup of Tea which received the official selection and nomination in over 72 international film festivals and won many awards including the 2nd best short film award at the EduDoc International Short Film Competition and was the official selection for the 20th International children film festival India 2017.

In 2017, she appeared opposite Sanjay Kapoor in Dil Sambhal Jaa Zara, a television series set in the backdrop of modern-age romance.

In 2019, she co-directed the award-winning shortfilm Ambu in which she played both a man and woman.The film was a part of the 10 best 48 Hour Film Project films contingent that went to Filmapalooza 2019 in Orlando.

In 2020, she was seen in the short film Unlocked: The Stranger which is the first of a series of 5 short films made during the COVID-19 lockdown written and directed by Abhijit Das.

Filmography

Films

Television

Short films

Music videos

Awards and nominations

References

External links 
 
 

Living people
Actresses from Haryana
People from Gurgaon
Indian television actresses
1987 births